Pepo  may refer to:

Pepo (botany), a modified berry with a hard outer rind, typical of cucurbits such as cucumbers and melons
Pepo Mill., a synonym of the genus Cucurbita

Pepo (ethnology), Plain Indigenous peoples in Taiwan.
Pepo (jurist), an 11th-century law teacher at the University of Bologna

Pepo (cartoonist), born René Ríos Boettiger, a Chilean cartoonist, who used Pepo as a pseudonym

 PEPO Lappeenranta, a Finnish football club

Pepo (film), a 1935 Armenian film made by Hamo Beknazarian
Nickname of Susilo Bambang Yudhoyono